Waterkloof Park is a tiny suburb of the city of Pretoria, South Africa. Located southeast of Waterkloof, it is home to some of the city's most expensive real estate.

References

Suburbs of Pretoria